Australian Football Council may refer to:

 Australian Amateur Football Council, the governing body for the sport of amateur Australian rules football in the states of Victoria, South Australia and Tasmania in Australia formed in 1933
 Australian National Football Council a national body for the sport of Australian rules football; known as the Australasian Football Council (1890–1927) and Australian National Football Council (1927–1993); though commonly referred to as the Australian Football Council before and after the name change
 International Australian Football Council, a body formed to govern Australian rules football internationally which existed between 1995 and 2002